Portals Athletic were a works football team based between the north Hampshire towns of Overton and Whitchurch. The club ran for 60 years until the loss of the sudden loss of their financial backing in 1987.

History

Portals Athletic FC were founded in 1927 as the works side of the Laverstoke Paper Mill, taking their name from the owners Portals Limited, and initially played in the local Basingstoke League where they enjoyed plenty of success - most notably in 1936–37 when they won the Hampshire Junior 'A' Cup.

In 1967 Portals were elected to Hampshire League Division 3 where they finished in a respectable mid-table final position. A year later the league was expanded and they were consequently placed in Division 3 West, where they finished 3rd before clinching promotion as runners-up in 1969–70. Portals quickly adapted well to life in what was then a highly competitive Division 2 and clinched a final position of 3rd which was enough to secure a second successive promotion.

Life in the top flight was tough for Portals and they were relegated straight back again to Division 2 where they remained until the 1983–84 season when they bounced back as champions. Portals enjoyed numerous cup successes during this period and quickly consolidated themselves in Division 1 for two seasons until in 1986 they (along with the league's top clubs with the required facilities) broke away to form the new Wessex League.

In the league's inaugural season Portals finished in a steady 12th position but in 1987 the parent company suddenly withdrew their support, forcing the club to sadly withdraw from the competition and disband just after celebrating their 60th anniversary. 
Another sad loss to non-league football.

The Portals ground at Laverstoke Park, located alongside the B3400 between Whitchurch and Overton, remained in use after the clubs untimely demise. During the 1999–2000 season it was leased to the short-lived Hampshire League side AFC Basingstoke.

Honours
Hampshire League Division 2
Champions 1983/84
Hampshire League Division 3 West 
Runners-up 1969/70
Hampshire FA Intermediate Cup
Winners 1939/40 and 1980/81
Hampshire FA Junior 'A' Cup
Winners 1936/37
North Hants Senior Cup
Winners 1979/80, 1980/81 and 1982/83
North Hants May Cup
Winners 1947/48

Records

League

Famous Players
In the early fifties, locally born Brian Clifton played for Portals before enjoying a long professional career with Southampton and Grimsby Town. Latterly, the former Leicester City and Southampton defender Ian White played for the club from 1968 to 1972 and for a spell was their player-manager.

References

Defunct football clubs in England
Association football clubs established in 1927
1927 establishments in England
Association football clubs disestablished in 1987
1987 disestablishments in England
Basingstoke and District Football League
North Hants League
Hampshire League
Wessex Football League
Defunct football clubs in Hampshire
Works association football teams in England